This is a list of 545 species in Polypedilum, a genus of midges in the family Chironomidae.

Polypedilum species

 Polypedilum aberufobrunneum Niitsuma, 1996 c g
 Polypedilum absensilobum Zhang & Wang g
 Polypedilum abyssiniae Kieffer, 1918 c g
 Polypedilum acifer Townes, 1945 i c g
 Polypedilum acristylum  g
 Polypedilum acutulum Oyewo & Saether, 1998 c g
 Polypedilum acutum Kieffer, 1915 c g
 Polypedilum aegyptium Kieffer, 1925 c g
 Polypedilum aequabe Zhang & Wang, 2007 c g
 Polypedilum aethiopis Lehmann, 1979 c g
 Polypedilum aferum Lehmann, 1981 c g
 Polypedilum akani Vardal, Bjorlo & Saether, 2002 c g
 Polypedilum akipulcher Kawai, Okamoto & Imabayashi, 2002 c g
 Polypedilum akisplendens Kawai, Inoue & Imabayashi, 1998 c g
 Polypedilum albiceps (Johannsen, 1932) c
 Polypedilum albicollum (Kieffer, 1922) c g
 Polypedilum albicorne (Meigen, 1838) c g
 Polypedilum albicorpus Tokunaga, 1964 c g
 Polypedilum albimanus  i g
 Polypedilum albinodus Townes, 1945 i c g
 Polypedilum albipalpus Chaudhuri, Guha & Gupta, 1981 c g
 Polypedilum albiventris Kawai, Inoue & Imabayashi, 1998 c g
 Polypedilum alboguttatum Kieffer, 1921 c g
 Polypedilum albonotatum Kieffer, 1920 c g
 Polypedilum albosignatum Kieffer, 1925 c g
 Polypedilum albulum Townes, 1945 i c g
 Polypedilum allansoni Freeman, 1958 c g
 Polypedilum alternans Forsyth, 1971 c g
 Polypedilum alticola Kieffer, 1913 c g
 Polypedilum amataura Bidawid, 1996 c g
 Polypedilum amoenum Goetghebuer, 1930 c g
 Polypedilum amplificatus Vardal, Bjorlo & Saether, 2002 c g
 Polypedilum amputatum Vardal, Bjorlo & Saether, 2002 c g
 Polypedilum anderseni Oyewo & Saether, 1998 c g
 Polypedilum angulum Maschwitz i c g
 Polypedilum angustifoceps Kieffer, 1913 c g
 Polypedilum angustum Townes, 1945 i c g
 Polypedilum anjarum Moubayed, 1989 c g
 Polypedilum annulatipes (Kieffer, 1910) c g
 Polypedilum annulatum Freeman, 1954 c g
 Polypedilum aparai Bidawid & Fittkau, 1996 c g
 Polypedilum apfelbecki (Strobl, 1900) c g
 Polypedilum apiaka Bidawid & Fittkau, 1996 c g
 Polypedilum apicale (Kieffer, 1917) c g
 Polypedilum apicatum Townes, 1945 i c g
 Polypedilum apiculusetosum Zhang & Wang g
 Polypedilum appendiculatum Goetghebuer, 1939 c g
 Polypedilum arara Bidawid & Fittkau, 1996 c g
 Polypedilum arcuatum Zhang & Wang g
 Polypedilum argentiniense Kieffer, 1925 c g
 Polypedilum aripuana Bidawid, 1996 c g
 Polypedilum artifer (Curran, 1930) i c g
 Polypedilum arua Bidawid, 1996 c g
 Polypedilum aruakan Bidawid & Fittkau, 1996 c g
 Polypedilum arudinetum (Goetghebuer, 1921) c g
 Polypedilum arundineti (Goetghebuer, 1921) g
 Polypedilum asakawaense Sasa, 1980 c g
 Polypedilum ascium Chaudhuri, Guha & Gupta, 1981 c g
 Polypedilum asoprimum Bidawid & Fittkau, 1995 g
 Polypedilum astictum Kieffer, 1920 c g
 Polypedilum asurini Bidawid, 1996 c g
 Polypedilum atrichon Maschwitz, 2000 c g
 Polypedilum atrinerve Kieffer, 1921 c g
 Polypedilum atroari Bidawid, 1996 c g
 Polypedilum australotropicus Cranston, 2000 c g
 Polypedilum aviceps Townes, 1945 i c g
 Polypedilum bakairi Bidawid & Fittkau, 1996 c g
 Polypedilum baniva Bidawid & Fittkau, 1996 c g
 Polypedilum barboyoni Serra-Tosio, 1981 c g
 Polypedilum basilarum Zhang & Wang, 2004 c g
 Polypedilum bellipes Kieffer, 1922 c g
 Polypedilum benokiense Sasa & Hasegawa, 1988 c g
 Polypedilum bergi Maschwitz i c g
 Polypedilum bicoloratum Freeman, 1961 c g
 Polypedilum bicrenatum Kieffer, 1921 c g
 Polypedilum bifalcatum Kieffer, 1921 c g
 Polypedilum bifurcatum Cranston, 1989 c g
 Polypedilum bilamella Zhang & Wang g
 Polypedilum bingoparadoxum Kawai, Inoue & Imabayashi, 1998 c g
 Polypedilum bipustulatum Freeman, 1958 c g
 Polypedilum bisetosum Wang, 1995 c g
 Polypedilum bispinum Zhang & Wang, 2007 c g
 Polypedilum branquinho Bidawid, 1996 c g
 Polypedilum braseniae (Leathers, 1922) i c g b
 Polypedilum brevipalpe Saether & Sundal, 1999 c g
 Polypedilum breviplumosum Zhang & Wang, 2004 c g
 Polypedilum brumale Kieffer, 1913 c g
 Polypedilum brunneicorne (Kieffer, 1911) c g
 Polypedilum brunneofasciatum Zorina & Makarchenko, 2000 c g
 Polypedilum buettikeri Cranston, 1989 c g
 Polypedilum bulbocaudatum Saether & Sundal, 1999 c g
 Polypedilum bullum Zhang & Wang, 2004 c g
 Polypedilum californicum Sublette, 1960 i c g
 Polypedilum callimorphus (Kieffer, 1911) c g
 Polypedilum canoeiro Bidawid, 1996 c g
 Polypedilum canum Freeman, 1959 c g
 Polypedilum carib Bidawid & Fittkau, 1996 c g
 Polypedilum carijona Bidawid & Fittkau, 1996 c g
 Polypedilum castornama Maschwitz, 2000 c g
 Polypedilum caudocula Kawai, 1991 c g
 Polypedilum ceciliaeformis (Chernovskij, 1949) c g
 Polypedilum centisetum Hazra, Mazumdar & Chaudhuri, 2003 c g
 Polypedilum centralis (Johannsen, 1932) c g
 Polypedilum chaudhurii Chaudhuri, Guha & Gupta, 1981 c g
 Polypedilum chelum Vardal, Bjorlo & Saether, 2002 c g
 Polypedilum chiriguano Bidawid, 1996 c g
 Polypedilum chubetuabeum Sasa & Suzuki, 2001 c g
 Polypedilum chubetubeceum Sasa & Suzuki, 2001 c g
 Polypedilum chubetucedeum Sasa & Suzuki, 2001 c g
 Polypedilum chubetudeeum Sasa & Suzuki, 2001 c g
 Polypedilum chutteri Harrison, 2001 c g
 Polypedilum ciliatum Kieffer, 1922 c g
 Polypedilum cinctum Townes, 1945 i c g
 Polypedilum circulum Chaudhuri & Chattopadhyay, 1990 c g
 Polypedilum clavatum Kieffer, 1917 c g
 Polypedilum clavigerum Kieffer, 1925 c g
 Polypedilum clavistylus Sublette & Sasa, 1994 c g
 Polypedilum coalitum Zhang & Wang, 2008 c g
 Polypedilum cocama Bidawid, 1996 c g
 Polypedilum cochlearum Zhang & Wang, 2005 g
 Polypedilum concomitatum (Johannsen, 1932) c g
 Polypedilum conghuaense Zhang & Wang g
 Polypedilum consobrinum Kieffer, 1916 c g
 Polypedilum convexum (Johannsen, 1932) c g
 Polypedilum convictum (Walker, 1856) i c g
 Polypedilum corniger Sublette & Sasa, 1994 c g
 Polypedilum crassiglobum Zhang & Wang, 2004 c g
 Polypedilum crassistyla Kawai, Inoue & Imabayashi, 1998 c g
 Polypedilum crassum Maschwitz, 2000 c g
 Polypedilum crenulosum Kieffer, 1921 c g
 Polypedilum cultellatum Goetghebuer, 1931 i c g
 Polypedilum cumberi Freeman, 1959 c g
 Polypedilum cyclus Zhang & Wang, 2005 c g
 Polypedilum cypellum Qi, Shi, Zhang & Wang, 2014 g
 Polypedilum czernyi Vimmer, 1934 c g
 Polypedilum dagombae Vardal, Bjorlo & Saether, 2002 c g
 Polypedilum daitoneoum Sasa & Suzuki, 2001 c g
 Polypedilum dangsanense Bjorlo, 2002 g
 Polypedilum decematoguttatum (Tokunaga, 1938) c g
 Polypedilum decemmaculatum Kieffer, 1920 c g
 Polypedilum declive (Kieffer, 1922) c g
 Polypedilum deletum Goetghebuer, 1936 c g
 Polypedilum dengae Zhang & Wang g
 Polypedilum depile Zhang & Wang, 2008 c g
 Polypedilum dewulfi Goetghebuer, 1936 c g
 Polypedilum dickebuschense Goetghebuer, 1936 c g
 Polypedilum digitifer Townes, 1945 i c g
 Polypedilum digitulum Freeman, 1959 c g
 Polypedilum dilatum Zhang & Wang, 2004 c g
 Polypedilum dimidiatum Kieffer, 1925 c g
 Polypedilum dissimilum  g
 Polypedilum distans (Kieffer, 1921) c
 Polypedilum dossenudum Oyewo & Saether, 1998 c g
 Polypedilum dubium (Kieffer, 1921) c g
 Polypedilum dudichi Berczik, 1957 c g
 Polypedilum dybasi Tokunaga, 1964 c g
 Polypedilum edense Ree, 1981 c g
 Polypedilum edensis Han Il Ree & Hoon Soo Kim, 1981 c g
 Polypedilum elgonatum Albu, 1980 c g
 Polypedilum elongatum Tokunaga, 1964 c g
 Polypedilum enshiense Song & Wang g
 Polypedilum ephippium Freeman, 1958 c g
 Polypedilum epleri Oyewo & Jacobsen, 2007 c g
 Polypedilum epomis Sublette & Sasa, 1994 c g
 Polypedilum esakii (Tokunaga, 1964) c g
 Polypedilum ewei Vardal, Bjorlo & Saether, 2002 c g
 Polypedilum exilicaudatum Saether & Sundal, 1999 c g
 Polypedilum exsectum (Kieffer, 1916) c
 Polypedilum falcatum Zhang, Song, Wang & Wang, 2015 g
 Polypedilum falciforme Maschwitz i c g
 Polypedilum fallax (Johannsen, 1905) i c g
 Polypedilum fanjingensis Zhang & Wang, 2005 c g
 Polypedilum fasciatipennis (Kieffer, 1910) c
 Polypedilum feridae Bidawid, 1996 c g
 Polypedilum festivipenne Kieffer, 1920 c g
 Polypedilum flagellatum Chaudhuri, Guha & Gupta, 1981 c g
 Polypedilum flavescens (Johannsen, 1932) c g
 Polypedilum flaviscapus Kieffer, 1922 c g
 Polypedilum flavoviride Goetghebuer, 1939 c g
 Polypedilum floridense Townes, 1945 i c g
 Polypedilum fodiens (Kieffer, 1916) c
 Polypedilum freemani Oyewo & Saether, 1998 c g
 Polypedilum fulgidum Kieffer, 1921 c g
 Polypedilum fuscipenne (Meigen, 1818) i c g
 Polypedilum fuscovittatum Kawai, Inoue & Imabayashi, 1998 c g
 Polypedilum fuscum Freeman, 1954 c g
 Polypedilum ge Bidawid & Fittkau, 1996 c g
 Polypedilum genesareth Kieffer, 1915 c g
 Polypedilum genpeiense Niitsuma, 1996 c g
 Polypedilum ginzangeheum Sasa & Suzuki, 2001 c g
 Polypedilum ginzanheium Sasa & Suzuki, 2001 c g
 Polypedilum ginzanijeum Sasa & Suzuki, 2001 c g
 Polypedilum ginzanprimum Sasa & Suzuki, 1998 c g
 Polypedilum ginzansecundum Sasa & Suzuki, 1998 c g
 Polypedilum ginzantertium Sasa & Suzuki, 1998 c g
 Polypedilum glabripenne (Kieffer, 1911) c g
 Polypedilum gladysae Oyewo & Saether, 1998 c g
 Polypedilum gomphus Townes, 1945 i c g
 Polypedilum griseistriatum (Edwards, 1931) c g
 Polypedilum griseoguttatum Kieffer, 1921 c g
 Polypedilum griseopunctatum (Malloch, 1915) i c g
 Polypedilum guarani Bidawid, 1996 c g
 Polypedilum guato  g
 Polypedilum hainanense Zhang & Wang, 2008 c g
 Polypedilum halterale (Coquillett, 1901) i c g
 Polypedilum hamigerum Kieffer, 1925 c g
 Polypedilum harrisi Freeman, 1959 c g
 Polypedilum harrisoni Oyewo & Saether, 1998 c g
 Polypedilum harteni Andersen & Mendes, 2010 c g
 Polypedilum hastaferum Harrison, 2001 c g
 Polypedilum henicurum Wang, 1995 c g
 Polypedilum heptasticum Kieffer, 1922 c g
 Polypedilum heptatomum Kieffer, 1920 c g
 Polypedilum hexastictum Kieffer, 1920 c g
 Polypedilum hiroshimaense Kawai & Sasa, 1985 c g
 Polypedilum hirticoxa (Johannsen, 1932) c g
 Polypedilum hirtiforceps (Kieffer, 1926) c g
 Polypedilum hirtimanum Kieffer, 1915 c g
 Polypedilum humile Kieffer, 1924 c g
 Polypedilum illinoense (Malloch, 1915) i c g
 Polypedilum inawageheum Andersen & Mendes, 2010 g
 Polypedilum incoloripenne Goetghebuer, 1936 c g
 Polypedilum infundibulum Zhang & Wang, 2004 c g
 Polypedilum insolitum Chaudhuri, Guha & Gupta, 1981 c g
 Polypedilum insulanum Tokunaga, 1964 c g
 Polypedilum integrum Kieffer, 1921 c g
 Polypedilum intermedium Albu, 1966 c g
 Polypedilum irapirapi Bidawid, 1996 c g
 Polypedilum iricolor Kieffer, 1916 c g
 Polypedilum iridis (Kieffer, 1911) c
 Polypedilum iriofegeum Sasa & Suzuki, 2000 c g
 Polypedilum iriogeheum Sasa & Suzuki, 2000 c g
 Polypedilum isigabeceum Sasa & Suzuki, 2000 c g
 Polypedilum isocerus Townes, 1945 i c g
 Polypedilum japonicum (Tokunaga, 1938) c g
 Polypedilum javanum Kruseman, 1939 c g
 Polypedilum jawaperi Bidawid & Fittkau, 1996 c g
 Polypedilum jianfengense Song & Wang g
 Polypedilum jii Zhang & Wang, 2005 c g
 Polypedilum johannseni Sublette & Sublette, 1973 c g
 Polypedilum jurana Bidawid, 1996 c g
 Polypedilum juruna Bidawid, 1996 c g
 Polypedilum kadiweu Bidawid-Kafka, 1996 g
 Polypedilum kajapo Bidawid & Fittkau, 1996 c g
 Polypedilum kakumense Oyewo & Saether, 1998 c g
 Polypedilum kamajura Bidawid, 1996 c g
 Polypedilum karaja Bidawid, 1996 c g
 Polypedilum karyana Bidawid & Fittkau, 1996 c g
 Polypedilum kaxuyana Bidawid & Fittkau, 1996 c g
 Polypedilum kempi (Kieffer, 1913) c g
 Polypedilum kibatiense Goetghebuer, 1936 c g
 Polypedilum kobotokense Sasa, 1981 c g
 Polypedilum kuikuro Bidawid & Fittkau, 1996 c g
 Polypedilum kunigamiense Sasa & Hasegawa, 1988 c g
 Polypedilum kyotoense (Tokunaga, 1938) c g
 Polypedilum labeculosum (Mitchell, 1908) i c g
 Polypedilum laetipenne Kieffer, 1920 c g
 Polypedilum laetum (Meigen, 1818) i c g
 Polypedilum laterale Goetghebuer, 1936 c g
 Polypedilum lateralum Zhang & Wang, 2004 c g
 Polypedilum leei Freeman, 1961 c g
 Polypedilum lehmanni Oyewo & Saether, 1998 c g
 Polypedilum lene (Becker, 1908) c g
 Polypedilum leopoldi Goetghebuer, 1932 c g
 Polypedilum leptovolsellae Ree, 2009 g
 Polypedilum leucolabis (Kieffer, 1921) c g
 Polypedilum leucopterum Kieffer, 1922 c g
 Polypedilum lichuanensis Wang, 1994 c g
 Polypedilum limnophilum Kieffer, 1920 c g
 Polypedilum limpidum (Johannsen, 1932) c g
 Polypedilum lineatum Chaudhuri, Guha & Gupta, 1981 c g
 Polypedilum litoralis (Chernovskij, 1949) c g
 Polypedilum lobiferum Freeman, 1954 c g
 Polypedilum longicrus Kieffer, 1921 c g
 Polypedilum longinerve (Kieffer, 1922) c g
 Polypedilum longisetum Moubayed, 1992 c g
 Polypedilum lotensis Moubayed-Breil, 2007 c g
 Polypedilum lucidum Chaudhuri, Guha & Gupta, 1981 c g
 Polypedilum lumiense (Kieffer, 1913) c g
 Polypedilum luteopedis Sublette & Sasa, 1994 c g
 Polypedilum luteum Forsyth, 1971 c g
 Polypedilum macrotrichum (Kieffer, 1921) c g
 Polypedilum maculatum Zorina & Makarchenko, 2000 c g
 Polypedilum maculipes Goethghebuer, 1933 c g
 Polypedilum majiis Lehmann, 1979 c g
 Polypedilum majus Kieffer, 1922 c g
 Polypedilum malickianum Cranston, 1989 c g
 Polypedilum marauia Bidawid, 1996 c g
 Polypedilum marcondesi Pinho & Mendes g
 Polypedilum marsafae Ghonaim, Ali & Osheibah, 2005 c g
 Polypedilum masoni Sublette i g
 Polypedilum masudai (Tokunaga, 1938) c g
 Polypedilum medium Zhang & Wang, 2004 c g
 Polypedilum medivittatum Tokunaga, 1964 c g
 Polypedilum mehinaku Bidawid & Fittkau, 1996 c g
 Polypedilum melanophilum (Kieffer, 1911) c g
 Polypedilum mellense (Goetghebuer, 1942) c g
 Polypedilum mengmanense Zhang & Wang g
 Polypedilum miagense Niitsuma, 1991 c g
 Polypedilum microzoster Sublette & Sasa, 1994 c g
 Polypedilum milnei Kieffer, 1913 c g
 Polypedilum misumaiquartum Sasa & Suzuki, 1998 c g
 Polypedilum misumaitertium Sasa & Suzuki, 1998 c g
 Polypedilum miyakoense Hasegawa & Sasa, 1987 c g
 Polypedilum mongollemeus Sasa & Suzuki, 1997 c g
 Polypedilum monodentatum Konstantnivo, 1948 c g
 Polypedilum monostictum Kieffer, 1916 c g
 Polypedilum moubayedbreili Ashe & O Connor, 2015 g
 Polypedilum multiannulatum (Tokunaga, 1938) c g
 Polypedilum mundurucu Bidawid, 1996 c g
 Polypedilum nahukuwa Bidawid & Fittkau, 1996 c g
 Polypedilum nanulus (Kieffer, 1916) c g
 Polypedilum napahaiense  g
 Polypedilum natalense (Kieffer, 1918) c g
 Polypedilum neoperturbans Ree, 2009 g
 Polypedilum nigribasale Tokunaga, 1964 c g
 Polypedilum nigritum Townes, 1945 i c g
 Polypedilum nodosum Johannsen, 1932 g
 Polypedilum novemmaculatum Hardy, 1960 i
 Polypedilum nubeculosum (Meigen, 1804) i c g
 Polypedilum nubens (Edwards, 1929) c g
 Polypedilum nubifer Skuse, 1889 c g
 Polypedilum nubiferum (Skuse, 1889) i c g
 Polypedilum nudiceps Chaudhuri, Guha & Gupta, 1981 c g
 Polypedilum nudifer Skuse, 1889 g
 Polypedilum nudimanum Kieffer, 1915 c g
 Polypedilum nudiprostatum Zhang, Wang & Saether, 2006 g
 Polypedilum numerus Chaudhuri, Guha & Gupta, 1981 c g
 Polypedilum nymphaeorum Maschwitz i c g
 Polypedilum nymphella (Kieffer, 1921) c
 Polypedilum obelos Sublette & Sasa, 1994 c g
 Polypedilum obliteratum Kieffer, 1920 c g
 Polypedilum obscurum Guha & Chaudhuri, 1982 c g
 Polypedilum obtusum Townes, 1945 i c g
 Polypedilum octosema Kieffer, 1922 c g
 Polypedilum ogoouense Vardal, Bjorlo & Saether, 2002 c g
 Polypedilum okiflavum Sasa, 1991 c g
 Polypedilum okiharaki Sasa, 1991 c g
 Polypedilum okipallidum Sasa, 1991 c g
 Polypedilum okueima Bidawid, 1996 c g
 Polypedilum ontario (Walley, 1926) i c g b
 Polypedilum opacum Kieffer, 1920 c g
 Polypedilum ophioides Townes, 1945 i c g
 Polypedilum opimum (Hutton, 1902) c g
 Polypedilum oresitrophum (Skuse, 1889) c g
 Polypedilum ornatipennis (Kieffer, 1918) c g
 Polypedilum ornatipes Kieffer, 1924 c g
 Polypedilum palauense Tokunaga, 1964 c g
 Polypedilum palliventre Freeman, 1961 c g
 Polypedilum paludosum Zorina & Makarchenko, 2000 c g
 Polypedilum panacu  g
 Polypedilum paraconvexum Zhang & Wang, 2005 c g
 Polypedilum paraconvictum Yamamoto, Yamamoto & Hirowatari g
 Polypedilum parallelum Zhang & Wang g
 Polypedilum paranigrum Kawai, Inoue & Imabayashi, 1998 c g
 Polypedilum parapicatum Niitsuma, 1991 c g
 Polypedilum parascalaenum Beck, 1962 i c g
 Polypedilum paraviceps Niitsuma, 1992 c g
 Polypedilum pardus Townes, 1945 i c g
 Polypedilum parthenogeneticum Donato & Paggi, 2008 c g
 Polypedilum parviacumen Kawai & Sasa, 1985 c g
 Polypedilum parvum Townes, 1945 i c g
 Polypedilum patulum Vardal, Bjorlo & Saether, 2002 c g
 Polypedilum paucisetum Zhang, Wang & Saether, 2006 c g
 Polypedilum paulusi Bidawid, 1996 c g
 Polypedilum pavidum (Hutton, 1902) c g
 Polypedilum pedatum Townes, 1945 i c g
 Polypedilum pedestre (Meigen, 1830) c g
 Polypedilum perturbans (Johannsen, 1932) c g
 Polypedilum phre Kieffer, 1925 c g
 Polypedilum plautum Oyewo & Saether, 1998 c g
 Polypedilum ploenense Kieffer, 1922 c g
 Polypedilum pollicium Zhang & Wang g
 Polypedilum ponapense Tokunaga, 1964 c g
 Polypedilum praegnans Oyewo & Saether, 1998 c g
 Polypedilum prasiogaster Freeman, 1961 c g
 Polypedilum procerum Zhang, Song, Wang & Wang, 2015 g
 Polypedilum prolixipartum Maschwitz, 2000 c g
 Polypedilum prominens Zhang & Wang, 2004 c g
 Polypedilum pruina Freeman, 1954 c g
 Polypedilum pseudacifer Zorina & Makarchenko, 2000 c g
 Polypedilum pseudamoenum Moubayed, 1992 c g
 Polypedilum pseudoconvictum Bidawid, 1996 c g
 Polypedilum pseudoflagellatum Chaudhuri, Guha & Gupta, 1981 c g
 Polypedilum pseudoiris Gromov, 1951 c g
 Polypedilum pseudomasudai Kawai, Inoue & Imabayashi, 1998 c g
 Polypedilum pseudoscalaenum Vimmer, 1934 c g
 Polypedilum pseudosordens Zhang & Wang, 2005 c g
 Polypedilum pterosopilus Townes, 1945 i g
 Polypedilum pterospilus Townes, 1945 c g
 Polypedilum pulchripes (Meijere, 1924) c g
 Polypedilum pulchrum Albu, 1980 c g
 Polypedilum pulchum Townes, 1945 g
 Polypedilum pullum (Zetterstedt, 1838) c g
 Polypedilum pumilio (Kieffer, 1921) c g
 Polypedilum puri  g
 Polypedilum purimanus Kieffer, 1913 c g
 Polypedilum purus Bidawid, 1996 c g
 Polypedilum pygmaeum (Kieffer, 1921) c
 Polypedilum quadrifarium (Kieffer, 1922) c g
 Polypedilum quadriguttatum Kieffer, 1921 c g
 Polypedilum quadrimaculatum (Meigen, 1838) c g
 Polypedilum quinqueguttatum Kieffer, 1921 c g
 Polypedilum quinquesetosum (Edwards, 1931) c g
 Polypedilum ramiferum Kieffer, 1921 c g
 Polypedilum rissi Edwards, 1931 g
 Polypedilum rohneri Edwards, 1931 g
 Polypedilum rufomarginalis Chaudhuri, Guha & Gupta, 1981 c g
 Polypedilum sabbuhi Bidawid, 1996 c g
 Polypedilum saetheri Moubayed-Breil, 2007 c g
 Polypedilum saetosum Lehmann, 1981 c g
 Polypedilum sagittiferum (Tokunaga, 1938) c g
 Polypedilum sahariense Kieffer, 1926 c g
 Polypedilum salavoni Bidawid, 1996 c g
 Polypedilum salwiti Bidawid, 1996 c g
 Polypedilum sate Kieffer, 1925 c g
 Polypedilum sauteri Kieffer, 1921 c g
 Polypedilum scalaenulus (Edwards, 1932) c g
 Polypedilum scalaenum (Schrank, 1803) i c g b
 Polypedilum scharfi von Schrank, 1803 g
 Polypedilum scirpicola (Kieffer, 1921) c g
 Polypedilum scutellare Kieffer, 1922 c g
 Polypedilum seorsum (Skuse, 1889) c g
 Polypedilum shangujuensis Wang, 1994 c g
 Polypedilum shirokanense (Sasa, 1979) c g
 Polypedilum siamensis Moubayed, 1989 c g
 Polypedilum sibadeeum Sasa, Sumita & Suzuki, 1999 c g
 Polypedilum sibiricum Goetghebuer, 1933 c g
 Polypedilum sidoniensis Moubayed, 1989 c g
 Polypedilum silhouettarium Saether, 2004 c g
 Polypedilum simantoheium Sasa, Suzuki & Sakai, 1998 c g
 Polypedilum simantoijeum Sasa, Suzuki & Sakai, 1998 c g
 Polypedilum simantokeleum Sasa, Suzuki & Sakai, 1998 c g
 Polypedilum simantomaculatum Sasa, Suzuki & Sakai, 1998 c g
 Polypedilum simulans Townes, 1945 i c g
 Polypedilum simulator Kieffer, 1917 c g
 Polypedilum solimoes Bidawid, 1996 c g
 Polypedilum sordens (Wulp, 1874) i c g b
 Polypedilum spadix Tokunaga, 1964 c g
 Polypedilum sparganii (Kieffer, 1913) c
 Polypedilum spathum Zhang & Wang, 2007 c g
 Polypedilum spiesi Zhang & Wang, 2007 g
 Polypedilum spinalveum Vardal, Bjorlo & Saether, 2002 c g
 Polypedilum spinibojum Oyewo & Saether, 1998 c g
 Polypedilum stephani Lehmann, 1981 c g
 Polypedilum stictopternum Kieffer, 1920 c g
 Polypedilum stictopterus (Kieffer, 1921) c
 Polypedilum stratiotis (Kieffer, 1909) c
 Polypedilum stuckenbergi Freeman, 1961 c g
 Polypedilum subconfluens (Kieffer, 1922) c g
 Polypedilum subovatum Freeman, 1958 c g
 Polypedilum subscultellatum Sublette, 1960 i c g
 Polypedilum subulatum Saether & Sundal, 1999 c g
 Polypedilum sulaceps Townes, 1945 i c g
 Polypedilum surugense Niitsuma, 1992 c g
 Polypedilum suturalis (Johannsen, 1932) c g
 Polypedilum takaoense Sasa, 1980 c g
 Polypedilum tamagohanum Sasa, 1983 c g
 Polypedilum tamagoryoense Sasa, 1980 c g
 Polypedilum tamahamurai (Sasa, 1983) c g
 Polypedilum tamaharaki Sasa, 1983 c g
 Polypedilum tamahinoense Sasa, 1983 c g
 Polypedilum tamahosohige Sasa, 1983 c g
 Polypedilum tamanigrum Sasa, 1983 c g
 Polypedilum tamasemusi Sasa, 1983 c g
 Polypedilum tana Cranston & Judd, 1989 c g
 Polypedilum tananense Sasa & Hasegawa, 1988 c g
 Polypedilum tenue (Kieffer, 1921) c g
 Polypedilum tenuis Zhang & Wang, 2005 c g
 Polypedilum tenuitarse (Kieffer, 1922) c g
 Polypedilum tesfayi Harrison, 1996 c g
 Polypedilum tetrachaetum (Goetghebuer, 1919) c g
 Polypedilum tetracrenatum Hirvenoja, 1962 c g
 Polypedilum tetrasema Kieffer, 1922 c g
 Polypedilum tetrastictum Kieffer, 1920 c g
 Polypedilum tiberiadis Kieffer, 1915 c g
 Polypedilum tigrinum (Hashimoto, 1983) c g
 Polypedilum tirio Bidawid & Fittkau, 1996 c g
 Polypedilum titicacae Roback & Coffman, 1983 c g
 Polypedilum tobadecima Kikuchi & Sasa, 1990 c g
 Polypedilum tobanona Kikuchi & Sasa, 1990 c g
 Polypedilum tobaoctavum Kikuchi & Sasa, 1990 c g
 Polypedilum tobaseptimum Kikuchi & Sasa, 1990 c g
 Polypedilum tobaundecima Kikuchi & Sasa, 1990 c g
 Polypedilum tochibicolor Niitsuma, 1991 c g
 Polypedilum togapallidum Kikuchi & Sasa, 1990 g
 Polypedilum tokaraheium Sasa & Suzuki, 1995 c g
 Polypedilum tokaraijeum Sasa & Suzuki, 1995 c g
 Polypedilum tokunagai Sasa & Suzuki, 1995 g
 Polypedilum tonnoiri Freeman, 1961 c g
 Polypedilum trapezium Zhang & Wang g
 Polypedilum tridens Freeman, 1955 c g
 Polypedilum tridentatum Konstantinov, 1952 c g
 Polypedilum trigonum Townes, 1945 i c g
 Polypedilum trigonus  b
 Polypedilum trinimaculum (Tokunaga, 1940) c g
 Polypedilum tripunctum Chaudhuri, Guha & Gupta, 1981 c g
 Polypedilum tristictum Kieffer, 1920 c g
 Polypedilum tritum (Walker, 1856) i c g b
 Polypedilum trombetas Bidawid, 1996 c g
 Polypedilum tropicum Kieffer, 1913 c g
 Polypedilum trukense (Tokunaga, 1940) c g
 Polypedilum tsukubaense Sasa, 1979 g
 Polypedilum tuberculatum (Tokunaga, 1940) c g
 Polypedilum tuberculum Maschwitz, 2000 c g
 Polypedilum tuburcinatum Andersen & Bello Gonzalez g
 Polypedilum tupi Bidawid, 1996 c g
 Polypedilum tusimageheum Sasa & Suzuki, 1999 c g
 Polypedilum tusimaheium Sasa & Suzuki, 1999 c g
 Polypedilum tusimaijeum Sasa & Suzuki, 1999 c g
 Polypedilum txicao Bidawid & Fittkau, 1996 c g
 Polypedilum udominutum Niitsuma, 1992 c g
 Polypedilum umayo Roback & Coffman, 1983 c g
 Polypedilum unagiquartum Sasa, 1985 c g
 Polypedilum uncinatum (Goetghebuer, 1921) c g
 Polypedilum unifasciatum Kieffer, 1922 c g
 Polypedilum unifascium (Tokunaga, 1938) c g
 Polypedilum vanderplanki Hinton, 1951 c g
 Polypedilum variegatum Goetghebuer, 1931 c g
 Polypedilum vectum (Johannsen, 1932) c g
 Polypedilum vespertinum (Skuse, 1889) c g
 Polypedilum vibex Townes, 1945 i c g
 Polypedilum villcanota Roback & Coffman, 1983 c g
 Polypedilum vogesiacum Goetghebuer, 1944 c g
 Polypedilum volselligum Saether & Sundal, 1999 c g
 Polypedilum walleyi Townes, 1945 i c g
 Polypedilum watsoni Freeman, 1961 c g
 Polypedilum wayana Bidawid & Fittkau, 1996 c g
 Polypedilum wirthi Freeman, 1961 c g
 Polypedilum xamatari Bidawid & Fittkau, 1996 c g
 Polypedilum xavante Bidawid & Fittkau, 1996 c g
 Polypedilum xiborena Bidawid, 1996 c g
 Polypedilum xuei Zhang & Wang, 2004 c g
 Polypedilum yakubeceum Sasa & Suzuki, 2000 c g
 Polypedilum yakucedeum Sasa & Suzuki, 2000 c g
 Polypedilum yakudeeum Sasa & Suzuki, 2000 c g
 Polypedilum yamasinense Tokunaga, 1940 g
 Polypedilum yammounei Moubayed, 1992 c g
 Polypedilum yanomami Bidawid & Fittkau, 1996 c g
 Polypedilum yapense Tokunaga, 1964 c g
 Polypedilum yaumounei Bidawid & Fittkau, 1995 g
 Polypedilum yavalapiti Bidawid & Fittkau, 1996 c g
 Polypedilum yongsanense Ree, 1981 c g
 Polypedilum youngsanensis Han Il Ree & Hoon Soo Kim, 1981 c g
 Polypedilum zavreli (Kieffer, 1922) c

Data sources: i = ITIS, c = Catalogue of Life, g = GBIF, b = Bugguide.net

References

Polypedilum